is a former Japanese football player.

Club career
Bando was born in Himeji on August 2, 1979. After graduating from high school, he joined J1 League club Gamba Osaka in 1998. He played many matches as substitute forward. He was transferred to J2 League club Consadole Sapporo in 2000. He scored 15 goals and helped them to promote to J1. He moved to Vissel Kobe in 2002 based in his local Hyogo Prefecture and became one of the key players in the team. He scored 17 goals in the 2004 season, which made him the third most prolific goalscorer in the league. He then returned to Gamba in 2006. He scored 16 goals and his good form earned him a call-up to the national team. In 2007, Gamba won the champions in J.League Cup. Although he could not play many matches for injury in 2008, Gamba won the champions in AFC Champions League first Asian title in the club history. Gamba also won the 2008 Emperor's Cup. At Emperor's Cup Final, he played as substitute forward and scored a winning goal in extra time. However his opportunity to play decreased behind new player Cho Jae-jin and Leandro in 2009. In 2010, Bando moved to Osaka's cross town rivals, Cerezo Osaka. Although he played many matches as substitute forward, he scored 10 goals in 2011. However he could hardly play in the match in 2013. In July, he moved to Sagan Tosu. However he could not play many matches. In 2015, he moved to J2 club Omiya Ardija. He played many matches in 2015 and Ardija was promoted to J1. However he could hardly play in the match from 2016. In 2018, he move to J3 League club FC Ryukyu. He played many matches and the club won the champions in 2018. Although the club was promoted to J2 from 2019, he left the club end of 2018 season.

National team career
He represented Japan at the Under-19 and Under-20 levels. He was a member of the Japan U-20 national team for 1999 World Youth Championship held in Nigeria. He made his senior national team debut on October 4, 2006, in a friendly match against Ghana when he replaced Satoru Yamagishi in the 67th minute. His first goal for his country came on October 11, 2006 in an 2007 Asian Cup qualification against India. He was chosen for the 2007 Asian Cup finals but had to withdraw due to injury.

Club statistics

National team statistics

Appearances in major competitions

Goals for Senior National Team

Team honors
Gamba Osaka
 AFC Champions League - 2008
 Emperor's Cup - 2008, 2009
 J.League Cup - 2007
 Japanese Super Cup - 2007
Japan
 FIFA World Youth Championship - 1999 (Runners-up)

References

External links

 
 Japan National Football Team Database
 

1979 births
Living people
Association football people from Hyōgo Prefecture
Japanese footballers
Japan youth international footballers
Japan international footballers
J1 League players
J2 League players
J3 League players
Gamba Osaka players
Hokkaido Consadole Sapporo players
Vissel Kobe players
Cerezo Osaka players
Sagan Tosu players
Omiya Ardija players
FC Ryukyu players
Association football forwards